Levirate marriage is a type of marriage in which the brother of a deceased man is obliged to marry his brother's widow. Levirate marriage has been practiced by societies with a strong clan structure in which exogamous marriage (i.e. marriage outside the clan) is forbidden.

Etymology
The term levirate is derived from the Latin levir, meaning "husband's brother".

Background and rationale

Levirate marriage can, at its most positive, serve as protection for the widow and her children, ensuring that they have a male provider and protector. Levirate marriage can be a positive in a society where women must rely on men to provide for them, especially in societies where women are under the authority of, dependent on, in servitude to or regarded as possessions of their husbands, and to ensure the survival of the clan. The practice of levirate marriage is strongly associated with patriarchal societies. The practice was extremely important in ancient times (e.g., Ancient Near East), and remains so today in parts of the world. Having children enables the inheritance of land, which offers security and status.

A levirate marriage might only occur if a man died childless, in order to continue his family line. The anthropologist Ruth Mace also found that the practice of widow inheritance by younger brothers, common in many parts of Africa, serves to reduce population growth, as these men will be forced to marry older (and hence, less fertile) women.

Judaism

Either of the parties may refuse to go through with the marriage, but both must go through a ceremony, known as halizah, involving a symbolic act of renunciation of a yibbum marriage. Sexual relations with one's brother's wife are otherwise forbidden by Leviticus 18 and Leviticus 20.

Jewish custom has seen a gradual decline of yibbum in favor of halizah, to the point where in most contemporary Jewish communities, and in Israel by mandate of the Chief Rabbinate, yibbum is prohibited.

Islam
Islamic law (sharia) clearly lays down rules for marriage, including who may marry whom, and although the Quran does not prohibit a man from marrying his brother's widow, it does insist that if it were to be done, it should be treated as a normal marriage with the wife’s consent and a mahr.

Eurasia

Scythia
The levirate custom was revived in Scythia if there were shaky economic conditions in the decedent's family. Khazanov, citing [Abramzon, 1968, p. 289 - 290], mentions that during World War II, the levirate was resurrected in Central Asia. In these circumstances, adult sons and brothers of the deceased man held themselves responsible to provide for his dependents. One of them would marry the widow and adopt her children, if there were any.

Central Asia and Xiongnu
The levirate custom survived in the society of Northeastern Caucasus Huns until the 7th century CE. The Armenian historian Movses Kalankatuatsi states that the Savirs, one of Hunnish tribes in the area, were usually monogamous, but sometimes a married man would take his brother's widow as a polygynous wife. Ludmila Gmyrya, a Dagestani historian, asserts that the levirate survived into "ethnographic modernity" (from the context, probably 1950s). Kalankatuatsi describes the form of levirate marriage practised by the Huns. As women had a high social status, the widow had a choice whether to remarry or not. Her new husband might be a brother or a son (by another woman) of her first husband, so she could end up marrying her brother-in-law or stepson; the difference in age did not matter. Hungarians also practiced levirate marriages. Koppány's rebellion against the Christian king Stephen I and claim to marry Sarolt, the widow of his relative Géza, was qualified as an incestuous attempt by 14th-century Hungarian chronicles, but was fully in line with the pagan custom.

India
In India, this custom is still popular in rural areas. In 2017, the Indian Army removed a rule which restricted payment of monetary allowances to widows of gallantry awardees if she marries someone other than the late husband's brother. Previously, the payment of an allowance was continued until her death or until she re-married, unless the new husband was the late husband’s brother.

Indonesia
According to the adat (customary practice) of the Karo people in North Sumatra, Indonesia, polygyny is permitted. A study of Kutagamber, a Karo village in the 1960s, noted one instance of the practice, as a result of levirate. The Indonesian term for it is "turun ranjang" (lit.: get down off one's bed).

Japan
The Japanese had a custom of  levirate marriage called aniyome ni naosu (兄嫁に直す) during the Meiji period.

Kurds
Levirate marriages among the Kurds are very common and also among the Kurds in Turkey, especially in Mardin.
Levirate is practised in Kurdistan: a widowed woman stays with her husband's family. If she is widowed when her children are young, she is obliged to marry her deceased husband's brother. This form of marriage is called levirate. Sororate marriage is another custom: When a man loses his wife before she bears a child or she dies leaving young children, her lineage provides another wife to the man, usually a younger sister with a lowered bride price. Both levirate and sororate are practiced to guarantee the well being of children and ensure that any inheritance of land will stay within the family.

Kirghiz
"The Kirghiz practice levirate whereby the wife of a deceased male is very often married by a younger sibling of the deceased." "Kirghiz ... followed levirate marriage customs, i.e., a widow who had borne at least one child was entitled to a husband from the same lineage as her deceased spouse."

Korea
The Korean kingdom of Goguryeo also had a custom of levirate marriage. An example of this was king Sansang of Goguryeo marrying the queen of Gogukcheon of Goguryeo, who was his older brother's wife.

Manchu
The existence of levirate marriage is supported by the case of Korean Princess Uisun who was brought to the Later Jin dynasty to marry the Manchu prince Dorgon and married his nephew after he died.

Africa

Cameroon
Among the Mambila of northern Cameroon, in regard to "Inheritance of wives: both levirates are practised throughout the tribe".

Kenya
As among the Maragoli of western Kenya, likewise "in the Luo case widows become mostly remarried to the deceased husband’s brother".

In the highlands of Kenya, it is "Nandi custom for a widow to be 'taken over' ... by a brother ... of her deceased husband." "According to customary law, it is tantamount to adultery for a widow to be sexually involved with a man other than a close agnate of her late husband."

Nigeria
In some parts of Nigeria, it is a common practice for a woman to marry her late husband's brother if she had children. This enabled the children to retain the father's family identity and inheritance. Although less common today, it is still practiced:

Somalia
In Somalia, levirate marriage is practiced and is called Dumaal, and provisions are made under Somali customary law or Xeer with regard to bride price (yarad). The widow is usually given a choice in the matter. In the past few decades since the start of the Somali Civil War, this type of marriage has fallen out of favor due to strict Islamic interpretations that have been imported to Somalia.

South Sudan

Levirate marriages are very common among South Sudan's Nilotic peoples, especially among the Dinka and Nuer people.

An alternate form, the ghost marriage, occurs when a groom dies before marriage. The deceased groom is replaced by his brother who serves as a stand in to the bride; any resulting children are considered children of the deceased spouse.

Zimbabwe
In Zimbabwe, levirate marriage is practiced amongst the Shona people, and provisions are made under Zimbabwe customary law, with regard to bride price (roora). The widow is usually given a choice in the matter, as well as the widower. In the past few decades, this type of marriage has fallen out of favor due to increased rural-to urban migration as well as improved literacy for women and the girl-child in general.

In popular culture
The plot of Holy Matrimony (1994) is based on a levirate marriage, but the real-life Hutterites don't have such custom.

In the TV series Deadwood, Seth Bullock is married to his brother's widow. This is a plot point used to mitigate guilt in the adulterous affair between Alma (another widow), and Seth (2005). 

In the Tamil novel Arukattuthurai (2006), Aruldas, (younger brother of Samuel) marries his sister-in-law Samuthiravalli, nearly three years after Samuel goes missing.

In A Song of Ice and Fire, Lord Eddard Stark marries his brother Brandon's betrothed, Catelyn Tully after the death of Brandon.

In Hell on Wheels (2011–'16),  it makes mention of Eva's late husband Gregory Toole having killed himself, his brother having tradition to marry her as his brother's widow.

See also
 Avunculism, a cultural custom in which a maternal uncle demonstrates some institutionalised interest in his sister’s offspring and may take on many of the responsibilities typically associated with fatherhood; this is a role, for instance, among American Indian peoples who have matrilineal cultures.
 Sororal polygyny, a marriage of two or more sisters and a man.
 Fraternal polyandry, a marriage of two or more brothers and one woman
 Genealogy of Jesus, in which Levirate marriage is offered to explain discrepancies
 Posthumous marriage, a marriage in which at least one party is dead
 Widow conservation

References

Customs involving siblings
Widow inheritance